Grindelia decumbens, the reclined gumweed, is a North American species of flowering plants in the family Asteraceae. It is native to the southwestern United States, in the States of New Mexico and Colorado.

Grindelia decumbens grows on dry hills and plains, and along streambanks. The plant usually produces numerous flower heads in open, branching arrays. Each head has 12-24 ray flowers, surrounding a large number of tiny disc flowers.

References

decumbens
Endemic flora of the United States
Flora of Colorado
Flora of New Mexico
Plants described in 1896
Flora without expected TNC conservation status